Barre Adan Shire, also known as Barre Hiiraale, Barre "Hirale" Aden Shire, or Abdikadir Adan Shire, is a former Minister of Defense of the Somali Transitional Federal Government (TFG). He was previously the TFG  Minister for National Reconstruction and Resettlement. Hiiraale was also the chairman of the now defunct Juba Valley Alliance, which controlled Southern and Southwestern Somalia, including the nation's third-largest city, the strategic port town of Kismayo. During his time in office, Hiiraale presided over the country's largest autonomous area, as well as commanding an extensive militia.

Biography
Barre Hiiraale was born in Geladin, which today is part of the Ogaden region in Ethiopia. He later moved to neighbouring Abudwak in the Galgadud region of Somalia, and from there on to Mogadishu for secondary school. For his post-secondary education, Hiiraale attended the prestigious United States Military Academy at West Point. That scholarship and patronage were part of Cold War-era treaties signed by Mogadishu and Washington in exchange for Washington's use of naval facilities in the coastal Somali cities of Kismayo, Mogadishu, and Berbera. Hiiraale returned to Somalia with a degree in Military Science, as well as Political Relations in military warfare.

Somali Civil War
In the years of the Somali Civil War, he served as the commander of the Somali National Front (SNF). Under Col. Hirale's command, the SNF defeated the forces of Mohamed Farah Aidid and his USC in the Gedo region. The SNF then took control of Kismayo and the Lower Jubba region with the defeat and ousting of Mohammed Said Hersi "Morgan" and his SRRC Allied militias composed of the Ogaden SPM, the Harti SSDF, and the Rahanweyn RRA.

Juba Valley Alliance
He was chairman of the Juba Valley Alliance (Isbahaysiga Dooxada Juba), which declared autonomy from the rest of Somalia in 1998, and controlled Kismayo and the Juba Valley until the defeat of his forces by the ICU in 2006.

On August 6, 2001, after 10 days of heavy fighting in a battle involving 40 technicals and 1,000 militiamen, the JVA took the town of Jilib from the SRRC.

With hopes to end the violence, Col. Hirale participated in the Somali Reconciliation Conference, held in Eldoret, Kenya, in 2002.

Transitional Federal Government

Col. Hirale serves as Defense Minister in Somalia's Transitional Federal Government. In November 2005, he was instrumental in making a compromise proposal to help establish the TFG.

He suffered the loss of Kismayo in September 2006, and further defeat during ICU's takeover of the Juba Valley in October 2006.  On October 14, his wife was arrested in Kismayo, along with a number of other women.

He regrouped his forces in Gedo region, and successfully lead the counterattacking TFG forces, who, alongside Ethiopian troops, won successive battles during December 2006, eventually forcing the ICU back to Mogadishu, where, on December 29, the TFG and Ethiopian forces took Mogadishu.

Retaking the Juba Valley

On December 29, 2006, TFG forces under Defense Minister (and former head of the Juba Valley Alliance) Barre Adan Shire Hiiraale entered Bu'aale, approximately 150 km north of Kismayo. Ethiopian jets continued to patrol over Jilib, and a column of 15 tanks was reported heading towards Bu'aale and Jilib. The Islamic militia reportedly mined the road to Jilib.

Battle of Jilib

On December 31, 2006, the Battle of Jilib determined the control of the approaches to Kismayo. The result of the battle was the retaking of Kismayo on January 1, 2007, which was abandoned by ICU forces.

Peace Building
On December 31, 2006,  the Defense minister and his army confronted two opposing militias who were disputing the control of a vehicle left behind. Apparently, upon the Defense minister approaching them, they both united their guns towards the Defense minister and his army, forcing them to defend themselves. The casualties reported numbered 10 for the combined militia and 2 for the Defense minister.

Pardon Offered to Islamists
On January 2, 2007, in Kismayo, Col. Hiiraale offered an amnesty to former members of the ICU forces.  He also spoke about the strength of the new government: "You have heard a lot of times that the transitional government is weak... But I will confirm [to] you that the national army are in control of all regions in the country - east, centre and south."

Arrest by Ethiopia
On May 3, 2011, it was reported Barre Hirale was arrested by Ethiopian forces near Dolow, in the Gedo region, but was released shortly thereafter and later secretly moved out of Dolow with 5 militia men from Alidere tribe who took him to Elwak. Barre Hirale later went to Nairobi from Elwak.

Keeping low profile

Barre Hiraale kept low profile from politics since 2011 when combined forces of AMISOM and Rascamboni Brigade forced him out of Kismayu.

References

.

Year of birth missing (living people)
Living people
Somalian military leaders
United States Military Academy alumni
Members of the Transitional Federal Parliament
Government ministers of Somalia
Somali National Front politicians
People of the Somali Civil War